Season twenty-five of El Gran Show premiered on October 1, 2022, on the América Televisión network.

The show returned to its original format after five years of being presented with other versions.

Cast

Couples

Host and judges
Gisela Valcárcel and Aldo Díaz returned as hosts, while Morella Petrozzi, Tilsa Lozano, Adolfo Aguilar and Michelle Alexander returned as judges.

References

External links

El Gran Show
2022 Peruvian television seasons